"Kiss Goodbye" is a song by Avant.

"Kiss Goodbye" may also refer to:

"Kiss Goodbye", a song by Little Big Town from The Reason Why
"A Kiss Goodbye", by Carola from her album My Show, also covered by Whatfor

See also
"Kiss Goodnight", a 2012 single by Tyler Shaw
Kiss It Goodbye, a band from Seattle, Washington
Goodbye kiss (disambiguation)